YAP1 (yes-associated protein 1), also known as YAP or YAP65, is a protein that acts as a transcription coregulator that promotes transcription of genes involved in cellular proliferation and suppressing apoptotic genes. YAP1 is a component in the hippo signaling pathway which regulates organ size, regeneration, and tumorigenesis. YAP1 was first identified by virtue of its ability to associate with the SH3 domain of Yes and Src protein tyrosine kinases. YAP1 is a potent oncogene, which is amplified in various human cancers.

Structure 

Cloning of the YAP1 gene facilitated the identification of a modular protein domain, known as the WW domain.  Two splice isoforms of the YAP1 gene product were initially identified, named YAP1-1 and YAP1-2, which differed by the presence of an extra 38 amino acids that encoded the WW domain. Apart from the WW domain, the modular structure of YAP1 contains a proline-rich region at the very amino terminus, which is followed by a TID (TEAD transcription factor interacting domain).  Next, following a single WW domain, which is present in the YAP1-1 isoform, and two WW domains, which are present in the YAP1-2 isoform, there is the SH3-BM (Src Homology 3 binding motif). Following the SH3-BM is a TAD (transactivation domain) and a PDZ domain-binding motif (PDZ-BM) (Figure 1).

Function 
YAP1 is a transcriptional co-activator and its proliferative and oncogenic activity is driven by its association with the TEAD family of transcription factors, which up-regulate genes that promote cell growth and inhibit apoptosis. Several other functional partners of YAP1 were identified, including RUNX, SMADs, p73, ErbB4, TP53BP2, LATS1/2, PTPN14, AMOTs, and ZO1/2. YAP1 and its close paralog, TAZ (WWTR1), are the main effectors of the Hippo tumor suppressor pathway. When the pathway is activated, YAP1 and TAZ are phosphorylated on a serine residue and sequestered in the cytoplasm by 14-3-3 proteins. When the Hippo pathway is not activated, YAP1/TAZ enter the nucleus and regulate gene expression.

It is reported that several genes are regulated by YAP1, including Birc2, Birc5, connective tissue growth factor (CTGF), amphiregulin (AREG), Cyr61, Hoxa1 and Hoxc13.

YAP/TAZ have also been shown to act as stiffness sensors, regulating mechanotransduction independently of the Hippo signalling cascade.

As YAP and TAZ are transcriptional co-activators, they do not have DNA-binding domains. Instead, when inside the nucleus, they regulate gene expression through TEAD1-4 which are sequence-specific transcription factors that mediate the main transcriptional output of the Hippo pathway. The YAP/TAZ and TEAD interaction competitively inhibits and actively dissociates the TEAD/VGLL4 interaction which functions as a transcriptional repressor. Mouse models with YAP over-expression have been shown to exhibit up-regulation of the TEAD target gene expression which results in increased expansion of progenitor cells and tissue overgrowth.

Regulation

Biochemical 

At the biochemical level, YAP is part of and regulated by the Hippo signaling pathway where a kinase cascade results in its “inactivation”, along with that of TAZ. In this signaling cascade, TAO kinases phosphorylate Ste20-like kinases, MST1/2, at their activation loops (Thr183 for MST1 and Thr180 for MST2). Active MST1/2 then phosphorylate SAV1 and MOB1A/B which are scaffold proteins that assist in the recruitment and phosphorylation of LATS1/2. LATS1/2 can also be phosphorylated by two groups of MAP4Ks. LATS1/2 then phosphorylate YAP and TAZ which causes them to bind with 14-3-3, resulting in cytoplasmic sequestration of YAP and TAZ. The result of the activation of this pathway is the restriction of YAP/TAZ from entering the cell nucleus.

Mechanotransductive 
Additionally, YAP is regulated by mechanical cues such as extracellular matrix (ECM) rigidity, strain, shear stress, or adhesive area, processes that are reliant on cytoskeletal integrity. These mechanically induced localization phenomena are thought to be the result of nuclear flattening induced pore size change, mechanosensitive nuclear membrane ion channels, mechanical protein stability, or a variety of other factors. These mechanical factors have also been linked to certain cancer cells via nuclear softening and higher ECM stiffnesses. Under this framework, the nuclear softening phenotype of cancer cells would promote nuclear flattening in response to a force, causing YAP localization, which could explain its over-expression and promoted proliferation in oncogenic cells. Additionally, the higher ECM stiffness phenotype commonly seen in tumors due to enhanced integrin signaling could flatten the cell and nucleus, once again causing higher YAP nuclear localization. Likewise, the opposite effect of nuclear stiffening as a result of a variety of stimuli such as an over-expression of lamin A, has been shown to decrease nuclear YAP localization.

Clinical significance

Cancer 

Dysregulation of YAP/TAZ-mediated transcriptional activity is implicated in the development of abnormal cell growth and hyperactivation of YAP and TAZ has been observed amongst many cancers. Hence YAP1 represents a potential target for the treatment of cancer.

While YAP has been identified as a proto-oncogene, it can also act as a tumor suppressor depending on cellular context.

As a drug target
The YAP1 oncogene serves as a target for the development of new cancer drugs. Small compounds have been identified that disrupt the YAP1-TEAD complex or block the binding function of WW domains. These small molecules represent lead compounds for the development of therapies for cancer patients, who harbor amplified or overexpressed YAP oncogene.

Neuroprotection 

The Hippo/YAP signaling pathway may exert neuroprotective effects through mitigating blood-brain barrier disruption after cerebral ischemia/reperfusion injury.

Mutations 
Heterozygous loss-of-function mutations in the YAP1 gene have been identified in two families with major eye malformations with or without extra-ocular features such as hearing loss, cleft lip, intellectual disability and renal disease.

External links

References 

Genes on human chromosome 11
Transcription factors